Ignacio Alcocer Rodríguez (1870 – 1936) was the Governor of Coahuila from 13 April to November 1913, taking over from Venustiano Carranza. He was also Secretary of the Interior (Mexico) from 1913 to 1914

1870 births
1936 deaths
Mexican Secretaries of the Interior
Governors of Coahuila
20th-century Mexican politicians
Politicians from Saltillo